Bernard Harris (born 1956) is a former NASA astronaut.

Bernard Harris may also refer to:
 Bernie Harris (basketball) (born 1950), basketball power forward
 Bernard Harris, boxer, see Leonard Doroftei
 Bernard Harris on List of Sheffield United F.C. players
 Bernie Harris (born 1962), Australian rules footballer

See also
 George Bernard Harris (1901–1983), United States federal judge
 Bernard Harrison (1934–2006), English cricketer and footballer